The ten-dollar coin is the highest-valued circulating coin issued in Hong Kong.

It circulates alongside the ten dollar banknote. It was first issued for circulation in 1994 to replace the $10 note, but the coin was not minted after 1997 and the Hong Kong Monetary Authority chose instead to reissue banknotes in 2002. A commemorative issue featuring the Tsing Ma Bridge was released in 1997 for the handover of Hong Kong to China. It was issued in uncirculated and proof sets. It is Hong Kong's only bi-metallic coin.

Mintage

References

 Ma Tak Wo 2004, Illustrated Catalogue of Hong Kong Currency, Ma Tak Wo Numismatic Co., LTD Kowloon Hong Kong. 

Coins of Hong Kong
Bi-metallic coins
Ten-base-unit coins